Metro Słodowiec is the 18th working station on Line M1 of the Warsaw Metro. It was opened on 23 April 2008 as the northern terminus of the extension from Marymont. On 25 October 2008, the line was extended further north to Młociny.

References

External links

Construction photos

Railway stations in Poland opened in 2008
Line 1 (Warsaw Metro) stations
Bielany